Samantha Jones was appointed interim permanent secretary and chief operating officer of the new Office of the Prime Minister in February 2022.  She was previously Boris Johnson's Expert Advisor on NHS Transformation and Social Care.

Her earlier career included 2 years working for Operose Health, the British operation of the Centene Corporation, director of new care models at NHS England, Chief Executive of West Hertfordshire Hospitals NHS Trust, regional director of Care UK and Chief Executive of Epsom and St Helier University Hospitals NHS Trust.

A nurse by background, she was previously voted the Health Service Journal Chief Executive of the year.

References

Living people
National Health Service people
English civil servants
Year of birth missing (living people)